Corona was a station along the Port Washington Branch of the Long Island Rail Road in the Corona section of Queens, New York City. It was one of two stations built by the Flushing Railroad in Corona, this one having been at Grand Avenue (later called National Avenue, now National Street) and 45th Avenue. The station first opened as Fashion Race Course in March 1855, then renamed West Flushing, once the West Flushing station at 108th Street closed and possibly when the race track was closed in 1869, and later renamed Corona around June 1872 when the Post Office was opened under the name of Corona. The race pens were located on this street which led directly north to the Fashion Race Course.

Service opened on April 2, 1855. The second depot built in September or October 1872 and was burned down on December 9, 1880. The former Corona Park depot from the White Line, abandoned four years earlier was moved to the site as a replacement around 1890 and was itself razed around September 1894. The fourth depot was built in September 1894 and was razed in 1930 due to a grade crossing elimination project. A temporary station was put in service to the south of the former location on May 8, 1930. Elevated platforms were constructed in mid-October, 1930, with westbound platforms opening on October 13 and eastbound platforms opening on October 17. The station stop was discontinued on April 8, 1964, the same year that the World's Fair station re-opened.

Original West Flushing station
Three blocks east of Corona station was another station named West Flushing that served the community at large. It was located at what is today 108th Street and 44th Avenue, and was built in September 1854. Though even the most scholarly railroad historians never knew when the station was closed, it may have been related to the purchase of the New York and Flushing Railroad by the Flushing and North Side Railroad, if not then the 1869 closure of the horse racing track served by Corona station. A December 31, 1869 timetable refers to a "West Flushing" station, but it is unknown whether it refers to the original station or not.

Baseball 
Fashion Race Course itself, which operated as a horse race track from 1853 to about 1869, was the venue used to stage a series of three intra-city all-star baseball games in 1858. These games were notable for having the first known admission charge to watch baseball. The games were held on July 20, August 17 and September 10. The race course is documented on some old maps. Its gate was located at what is now 37th Avenue and 103rd Street in Corona, about a mile west-southwest of Citi Field.

References

External links
Pride in Port: The Jekyll & Hyde Branch of the Long Island Railroad: (Forgotten New York)
Bob Emery Maps of Corona Station (Unofficial LIRR History Website)
Fashion Race Course 1858 all-star baseball game by John Thorn
Library of Congress collection, map of Brooklyn and Queens, showing Fashion Race Course, 1859 (north edge of West Flushing)
Library of Congress collection, map of Brooklyn and Queens, showing Fashion Race Course, 1872 (north edge of West Flushing)

Former Long Island Rail Road stations in New York City
Corona, Queens
Railway stations in Queens, New York
Railway stations in the United States opened in 1855
Railway stations closed in 1964
Baseball venues in New York City
Defunct horse racing venues in New York City
1855 establishments in New York (state)
1964 disestablishments in New York (state)